Langfjorden is a fjord in the municipitality of Alta in Troms og Finnmark, Norway. It is a 30 kilometre long westward branch of Altafjorden. At the bottom of the fjord is the village Langfjordbotn.

References

Fjords of Troms og Finnmark
Alta, Norway